Tony Romeo (December 25, 1938 – June 23, 1995) was an American songwriter. He is best known for writing the number 1 hit "I Think I Love You" by The Partridge Family as well as many other hit records, mostly during the 1960s and 1970s.

Other hits written by Romeo include "Oh Boy (The Mood I'm In)" by both Diana Trask and Brotherhood of Man; "Walking in the Sand", sung by Al Martino, which reached number 9 on the Adult Contemporary charts in 1970; "Indian Lake" for The Cowsills; and "I'm Gonna Make You Mine" by Lou Christie. He wrote songs for The Seekers, The Everly Brothers, Richard Harris and David Cassidy<ref name="davenport">Joe Davenport. "Records" (review of Cassidy's 1972 album Cherish), San Antonio Express and News, February 20, 1972, Sunday One section, page 21: At first blush you get the impression Cassidy is more at home with Tony Romeo tunes than with others as he sings 'Being Together' and a great 'I Am A Clown,' on which the true qualities of Cassidy's ability comes forward.</ref> among others.
His songs were used in such movies as Rain Man (1988) and Gaby: A True Story (1987). and the TV program The Debbie Reynolds Show (1969–1970). Through colleague Wes Farrell's Pocket Full of Tunes songwriting agency, Romeo additionally created commercial jingles to advertise such products as Breck shampoo, Coty cosmetics' fragrance Muguet de Bois, Pall Mall cigarettes, and Scripto lighters.

Off and on, during the 1960s and 1970s, he attempted to make a name for himself as a singer and recorded solo singles "My Ol' Gin Buddy and Me"/"Mr. Hunkachunk" for Columbia Records in 1966 and "Go Johnny Go"/ "Doctor Recommended Me a Potion" in 1977 for Lifesong Records. Overall, over 150 of his songs were recorded, in addition to working as a record producer. In 1970, he wrote music and lyrics for a musical-theater version of A Dog of Flanders. He also produced the duo, Good & Plenty (cf. Good & Plenty candy). He also wrote and produced the MGM album The Trout on which he performed along with his brother Frank Romeo and Cass Morgan, and the unreleased solo album Moonwagon''.

Romeo wrote nine platinum records. His most successful song, "I Think I Love You", was released in November 1970 by Bell Records, the first single released by The Partridge Family. The song hit number one on the U.S. Billboard Pop Singles chart for three weeks: November 15 – December 5, 1970 

During the last 15 years of his life, Romeo was a resident of Pleasant Valley. He died at home at the age 56 on June 23, 1995. His death was attributed to a heart attack. Romeo was survived by his mother Irene Romeo Perrelle of Watervliet, and his brother Frank Romeo of Watervliet.

Compositions

References

Songwriters from New York (state)
1939 births
1995 deaths
20th-century American musicians